85th Regiment or 85th Infantry Regiment may refer to:

 85th Regiment of Foot (disambiguation), several units of the British Army
 85th Burman Rifles, a unit of the British Indian Army
 85th Armoured Regiment (India)
 85th Infantry Regiment (United States)

Union Army (American Civil War):
 85th Illinois Infantry Regiment
 85th Indiana Infantry Regiment
 85th Ohio Infantry
 85th Pennsylvania Infantry Regiment

See also 
 85th Division (disambiguation)